NS Månedshefte ('NS Monthly Pamphlet') was a Norwegian periodical.

It was published on a monthly basis from 1941 to 1945 by the Nazi party Nasjonal Samling (NS), which held power during the German occupation of Norway. It contained ideological topics and political commentary. It was edited by Gunnar Næss and later Einar Syvertsen.

References

1941 establishments in Norway
1945 disestablishments in Norway
Defunct monthly newspapers
Defunct newspapers published in Norway
Nazi newspapers
Newspapers established in 1941
Publications disestablished in 1945